Bourekas films were a genre of Israeli-made comic melodrama films popular in Israel in the 1960s and 1970s.

History
Haaretz film critic Uri Klein describes Bourekas films as a "peculiarly Israeli genre of comic melodramas or tearjerkers... based on ethnic stereotypes". They were "home-grown farces and melodramas that provided escapist entertainment during a tense period in Israeli history".
The term is said to have been coined by the Israeli film director Boaz Davidson, the creator of several such films, as a play-on-words on the "Spaghetti Western" genre, known as such because that particular Western subgenre was produced in Italy. Bourekas are a popular food in Israeli cuisine.

Although Bourekas films were some of the most successful in the box office, they typically received terrible reviews from critics. They were cited as "low-brow" and "vulgar", with great concern as to this genre of film representing the Israeli people abroad.  In critiquing Sallah Shabbati Biltzki in Al HaMishmar said, "Because parties in Israel are presented not only in the distorted mirror of a distorted humor but also in the ugly mirror of the image of public and organizational life...One has to think twice if such a film should represent us abroad".

At the end of the 1970s, the popularity of the Bourekas film declined. In the 1980s, Israeli films became more politically charged and began to address controversial topics. Nowadays many of the Bourekas films have gained cult status in Israel.

Themes
The main theme in most Bourekas films is the conflict between ethnic cultures in Israel, in particular between the Mizrahi Jews and the Ashkenazi Jews, and in colonialist terms, between the "third world" (Mizrahi) and the "first world" (Ashkenazic). The protagonist is usually a Mizrahi Jewish man, almost always poor, canny and with street smarts, who comes into conflict with the institutions of the state or figures of Ashkenazi origin—mostly portrayed as rich, conceited, stuck-up, cold-hearted and alienated. In many of these films, actors imitate different Hebrew accents, especially that of Jews originating from Morocco, Persia, and Poland. They employ slapstick humour, alternative identities and a combination of comedy and melodrama.

Zuckermann (2005) argues that although "burekas films like snúker (Boaz Davidson 1975) and khakhám gamliél (Joel Silberg 1974) are regarded by many as the epitome of mizrahi culture, [they] are hybridic and modelled upon Ashkenazic shtetl life as in kúni lémel and shtétl kabtsíel in Méndele Móykher Sfórim's beémek habakhá."

In a paper entitled "A Shtetl in Disguise: Israeli Bourekas Films and their Origins in Classical Yiddish Literature", Rami Kimchi claims that the portrayal of Israeli Mizrahi communities in these films bears a strong resemblance to the portrayal of the 19th century East European shtetl by classic Yiddish writers. Kimchi attributes the commercial success of these films to their "hybridity", i.e. they were Israeli/Mizrahi and Diasporic/Ashkenazi at one and the same time, thereby satisfying the political, sociological, and psychological needs of both Mizrahi and Ashkenazi audiences in Israel. He believes eleven films produced between 1964 and 1977 make up the corpus of the genre.

Actors and directors 
Bourekas films were highly successful in Israel during the 1960s and 1970s, but were also criticized for being shallow. Some of the main actors and directors were:

 Ze'ev Revach: an actor and director who participated in many popular Bourekas film comedies such as Hagiga B'Snuker (1975), Charlie Ve'hetzi (1974), Rak Hayom (1976), Gonev Mi'ganav Patoor (1977), Ta'ut Bamispar (1979), Ha-Muvtal Batito (1987), Lo La'alot Yoter (1979), Sapar Nashim (1984), Pa'amaim Buskila (1998), and more. Revach eventually became the person which is most identified with the Bourekas films and continued to create those films until the end of the 1980s. 
 George Ovadiah: a director who created many melodramas which were influenced (and at times copied) from the Turkish cinema. The most prominent of his films are : Ariana (1971), Nurit (1972), Sarit (1974), West Side Girl (1979), and more. Obadiah also created comedies like Nahtche V'Hageneral (1972), Fishke Bemilu'im (1971) and Koreyim Li Shmil (1973). 
 Yehuda Barkan: an actor and director who participated in many Bourekas films such as Lupo (1970) and Lupo B'New York (1976), Katz V'Carasso (1971), Charlie Ve'hetzi (1974), Hagiga B'Snuker (1975), Bo Nefotzetz Million (1977) and more. Barkan also played in the 1980s Abba Ganuv film series and directed them.
 Boaz Davidson: a director of many Bourekas film comedies such as Charlie Ve'hetzi (1974), Hagiga B'Snuker (1975), Mishpahat Tzan'ani (1976), and Lupo B'New York (1976). His films Charlie Ve'hetzi and Hagiga B'Snuker had a 'revival' in the 1990s and a status of Israeli cult film status.
 Yosef Shiloach: Played in several Bourekas film comedies, in parallel with a set of dramatic and more serious roles he played in a variety of Hollywood films. A character which is identified with him in particular is "the Persian"—a somewhat sensual grotesque who possesses a strong Persian accent. 
Tuvia Tzafir: Played in several Bourekas films, particularly in the role of the grotesque "Ashkenazi" character.
Menahem Golan: a director and producer of many fiscally successful Bourekas films such as  Fortuna (1966), My Margo (1969), Lupo (1970), Queen of the Road (Malkat haKvish) and The Contract (both 1971). 
Haim Topol: Starred in Sallah Shabati (1965) before his breakout Golden Globe-winning role in the 1971 film adaption of Fiddler on the Roof.

Subgenres
"Gefilte fish" films, also known as "bourekas for Ashkenazim", are a marginal group of Bourekas films that feature Ashkenazi protagonists and ghetto folklore.  Some films in this subgenre include:

Two Kuni Lemels, 1966 (Israel Beker)
 Lupo, 1970 (Golan)
 Kuni Lemel in Tel Aviv (1976) (Joel Silberg)
 Lupo in New York (1976) (Davidson)
 Hershele, 1977 (Joel Silberg)
 Marriage Tel Aviv Style, 1980 (Joel Silberg)
 Aunt Klara (HaDoda Klara), 1977 (Avraham Hefner)

Notable films
Several prominent Bourekas films are listed below in chronological order of production.

 Sallah Shabbati (1964)—directed by Kishon and the first Israeli film to be nominated for an Academy Award
 Fortuna (1966)—directed by Menahem Golan
 Moishe Vintelator (1966)—directed by Uri Zohar
 999 Aliza Misrahi (1967)—directed by Menahem Golan
 Two Kuni Lemels (1966)—directed by Israel Beker
 Our Neighborhood (HaShkhuna Shelanu) (1968)—directed by Uri Zohar
 My Margo (1969)—directed by Menahem Golan
 Queen of the Road (Malkat haKvish) (1971)
 The Contract (1971)—directed by Menahem Golan
 Salomonico (1972)
 Ha-Meshahnei'a Ba'am (1973)
 Haham Gamliel (1973)
 Kazablan (1974)—a story of a young Mizrahi man who falls in love with an Ashkenazi girl, starring Yehoram Gaon
 Hagiga B'Snuker (1975)
 Yi'ihiyeh Tov Salmonico (1975)—with Reuven Bar-Yotam

See also
Israeli culture
Israeli cinema
Cannon Films

References

Film genres
Lists of Israeli films
1960s in film
1970s in film